Ivan Ivanovich Garanin (born August 1, 1945) is a former cross-country skier who represented the Soviet Union.

Garanin trained at VSS Enbek in Rudni, Kostanay Province. At the 1976 Winter Olympics in Innsbruck, Garanin took bronze medals in the 30 km and the 4 x 10 km relay. He later won the Vasaloppet, in 1977.

Garanin won a silver medal in the 4 x 10 km relay at the 1974 FIS Nordic World Ski Championships in Falun.

References

External links
 
 

1945 births
Living people
Cross-country skiers at the 1972 Winter Olympics
Cross-country skiers at the 1976 Winter Olympics
Olympic cross-country skiers of the Soviet Union
Olympic bronze medalists for the Soviet Union
Soviet male cross-country skiers
Vasaloppet winners
Olympic medalists in cross-country skiing
FIS Nordic World Ski Championships medalists in cross-country skiing
Medalists at the 1976 Winter Olympics